Avitus is a genus of jumping spiders that was first described by George and Elizabeth Peckham in 1896.

Species
 it contains six species, found in Brazil, Panama, Argentina, and on the Greater Antilles:
Avitus anumbi Mello-Leitão, 1940 – Brazil
Avitus castaneonotatus Mello-Leitão, 1939 – Argentina
Avitus diolenii Peckham & Peckham, 1896 (type) – Panama
Avitus longidens Simon, 1901 – Argentina
Avitus taylori (Peckham & Peckham, 1901) – Jamaica
Avitus variabilis Mello-Leitão, 1945 – Argentina

References

Salticidae genera
Salticidae
Spiders of Central America
Spiders of South America